Mahatma Gandhi Marg is a street, located in Lucknow, Uttar Pradesh in India, that travels through Hazratganj.

References

Roads in Lucknow